The Battle of Velata was fought at Tau'akipulu, Haʻapai, Tonga in September 1826, between Laufilitonga, monarch of the Tuʻi Tonga dynasty, and Taufa'ahau, heir apparent to the Tu'i Kanokupolu dynasty and then monarch of Tonga.

Moatunu Vakauta fighting skills and bravery proved formidable. According to records, women who stood and witnessed the battle held their chests in amazement at the strength and enormous bravery shown by Puakatau

Originated at the Battle of Velata. In the aftermath, Taufa'ahau slept while Moatunu Vakauta stood guard. Taufa'ahau woke up to find Moatunu still on sentry duty and for the first time bestowed the title Tu'uhetoka on the warrior. Other Tongan names and phrases also emerged as a result of the battle including locations and names such as Tau'aki Pulu (the war fought and won with bullets which commemorates the Battle of Velata was won through gunfire which aided in Taufa'ahau securing the remaining island group's of Vava'u, Niua's, Ha'apai and Tongatapu. 'Eua was still maintaining its independence under the ruling of Paukatau and Kaufana at that time. A deal and promise that was made between Kaufana and Taufa'ahau before the Battle of Velata was dishonoured by Taufa'ahau but claims the title of King of Tonga starts the Tupou dynasty. It is the name of the Royal palace of the Tupou lineage also), or War Kava ceremony before sailing to Velata, Taufa'ahau tested Puakatau Vakauta with a statement, saying that The Tu'i Tonga sent us a message "Tell the Kau Vaka'uta of 'Eua I have the (pulu papalangi) the white mans bullet awaiting them" - Tui Tonga. Puakatau Vakauta responded "Tell the Tui Tonga that the same bullet he obtains is the same bullets I'm bringing with my warrior's to Velata, and Let him know that in the dawn of day light we shall see whose bullets is the mightiest"  (they have bullets, we have bullets), Fanga'ihe Si, Loto'aniu and Tongaleleka (Tonga flee in fright), Pangai Lifuka (landing on the marked location), Fetu'ufuka (marked by the star) along with the well-known Tongan phrase Tu'aTalatau Tu'ataKilangi Houmakelikao 'ae Houma Niutao, meaning an individual or insignificant character who picks a fight or task that is far beyond his ability and results in total failure. The phrase originated when Namoa (Tupou) reprimanded Laufilitonga of the Tuʻi Tonga Dynasty for his declaration of war on Taufa'ahau. Laufilitonga was remorseful and submissive as he felt the fierce force and the fury of Puakatau Vakauta and 'Eua.

Aftermath
The battle also marked the end of any ruling authority of Laufilitonga and the Tuʻi Tonga in Ha'apai and the ascending of Taufa'ahau as the Tu'i Ha'apai or ruler of the Ha'apai Islands.

References

History of Tonga
1826 in Tonga
Conflicts in 1826
September 1826 events